Jam Factory was an American soul group from Syracuse, New York, active between 1970 and 1972. The six-man band was founded by Howie Wyeth of Syracuse University and featured Steve Marcone and Earl Ford on brass, Mark Hoffmann on guitar, Kent DeFelice on bass, Joe English on drums, and Gene McCormick on keyboards. The band played the Schaefer Music Festival in 1970. After leaving  Jam Factory, Joe English went on to be the drummer for Paul McCartney and Wings.

Discography

Albums
Sittin' In The Trap (1970) Epic Records

Singles
"Talk Is Cheap" / "Together" (1971) Epic Records

References

Musical groups from Syracuse, New York
American soul musical groups